Indonesia was participating in the 2017 Southeast Asian Games from 14 to 30 August 2017. The Indonesian contingent was represented by 535 athletes in 38 sports. A total of 55 gold medals are being targeted for 2017 edition.

Indonesian contingent collected a medal count of 38 gold, 63 silver and 90 bronze medals as the multi-sport events concluded on 30 August 2017.

Medal summary

Medal by sport

Medal by Date

Medalists

Multiple medalists
The following Indonesian competitors won several medals at the 2017 Southeast Asian Games.

References

2017
Southeast Asian Games
Nations at the 2017 Southeast Asian Games